iTunes Festival: London 2011 is the second extended play (EP) by British singer Adele, released in 2011. The EP was recorded live during the iTunes Festival London 2011 at The Roundhouse in London, England, United Kingdom.

Track listing

Chart performance

Release history

References

External links 
 

2011 EPs
2011 live albums
Adele live albums
ITunes-exclusive releases
Live EPs
XL Recordings EPs
XL Recordings live albums